Imereti (Georgian: იმერეთი) is a region of Georgia situated in the central-western part of the republic along the middle and upper reaches of the Rioni River. Imereti is the most populous region in Georgia. It consists of 11 municipalities and the city of Kutaisi, which is the capital of the region.

Subdivisions
The Imereti region has one self governing city (Kutaisi) and 11 municipalities with 163 administrative communities (temi), totalling to 549 populated settlements:
 Eleven cities: Baghdati, Chiatura, Khoni, Kutaisi, Sachkhere, Samtredia, Terjola, Tqibuli, Tsqaltubo, Vani and Zestafoni;
 Three dabas: Kharagauli, Kulashi and Shorapani (
 Villages: 535

Economy
Aside from the capital Kutaisi, significant towns and regional centres include Samtredia, Chiatura (manganese production centre), Tkibuli (coal mining centre),  Zestafoni (known for metals production), Vani, Khoni, and Sachkhere. Traditionally, Imereti is an agricultural region, known for its mulberries and grapes.

Demographics
The 800,000 Imeretians speak a Georgian dialect; they are one of the local culture-groups of the ethnically subdivided Georgian people.

Demographic

History
In late antiquity and early Middle Ages the ancient western Georgian kingdom of Egrisi existed on the territory of Imereti. Its king declared Christianity as an official religion of Egrisi in 523 AD. In 975-1466 Imereti was part of the united Georgian Kingdom. Since its disintegration in the 15th century, Imereti was an independent kingdom.

In the 17th-18th centuries, the kingdom of Imereti experienced frequent invasions by the Turks and paid patronage to the Ottoman Empire until 1810, when it was invaded and annexed by the Russian Empire. The last King of Imereti was Solomon II (1789-1810).

From 1918 to 1921, Imereti was part of the independent Democratic Republic of Georgia. Within the USSR, the region was part of the Transcaucasian SFSR from 1922–1936, and part of the Georgian SSR from 1936–1991. Since Georgian independence in 1991, Imereti has been a region of Georgia with Kutaisi as the regional capital.

See also
Kingdom of Imereti
Administrative divisions of Georgia (country)

Notes

References

External links
 Imereti.com - The Guide to Imereti, Georgia, Sakartvelo
 Official website
 Civil.GE

 
Regions of Georgia (country)
Former provinces of Georgia (country)
Historical regions of Georgia (country)